Everybody's Fool is a song by Evanescence.

Everybody's Fool may also refer to:
Everybody's Fool (novel), 2016 novel by Richard Russo, sequel to Russo's 1993 novel Nobody's Fool
"Everybody's Fool", a single by Teenage Fanclub from A Catholic Education 1990 
"Everybody's Fool", a song by German pop singer Sasha from Good News on a Bad Day 2007
"Everybody's Fool", a song by Butts Band from Hear and Now (album) 1975 
"Everybody's Fool", a song by Brenda and the Tabulations List of disco artists (A–E) 1979

See also
"Everybody's Somebody's Fool",  No. 1 hit for Connie Francis in 1960